Michael Edward Obermueller (born April 21, 1973) is a Minnesota lawyer and politician, a former member of the Minnesota House of Representatives. He represented District 38B in the southeastern Twin Cities metropolitan area from 2009 to 2011. In 2012 and 2014 Obermueller was the Democratic-Farmer-Labor Party candidate for United States Congress in the second congressional district, challenging incumbent John Kline.

Early life, education and career
Raised on a dairy farm near Glenwood City, Wisconsin, Obermueller attended Loras College in Dubuque, Iowa, graduating magna cum laude in 1996 with a B.A. in Media and Public Address, with a Political Science emphasis. He went on to the University of Iowa College of Law in Iowa City, earning his J.D. With High Distinction in 2001. Between college and law school, he worked as Director of Campus Dining Services for Aramark Corporation at Mount Marty College in Yankton, South Dakota.

Obermueller is an attorney for the Minneapolis law firm of Winthrop & Weinstine, P.A., where he focuses on commercial litigation and construction law.

Political career
Obermueller was first elected in 2008, succeeding three-term incumbent Rep. Lynn Wardlow. He was unseated by Republican Doug Wardlow in the 2010 general election. He was a member of the House K-12 Education Policy and Oversight Committee, and also served on the Finance subcommittees for the Bioscience and Workforce Development Policy and Oversight Division, of which he was vice chair, the Energy Finance and Policy Division, and the Higher Education and Workforce Development Finance and Policy Division.

2012 U.S. House campaign

In 2012 Obermueller won the endorsement of the Democratic-Farmer-Labor Party for United States Congress in Minnesota's 2nd congressional district, challenging five-term incumbent John Kline. He was unsuccessful, garnering 46% of the vote to Kline's 54%.

2014 U.S. House campaign

In 2014 Obermueller again was the Democratic-Farmer-Labor Party candidate for United States Congress in Minnesota's 2nd congressional district. This time incumbent John Kline defeated Obermuller by a 17-point margin.

Personal life
Participating in his local community, Obermueller is a member of the Dakota County Regional Chamber of Commerce and the Knights of Columbus, a board member for the Eagan Art Festival, and a volunteer coach for the Eagan Athletic Association.

References

External links 
 Rep. Mike Obermueller official Minnesota Legislature site
 Mike Obermueller for U.S. Congress official campaign site
 
 Session Weekly Working to unite: Obermueller hopes to represent by connecting, Minnesota Legislature, January 23, 2009

1973 births
Living people
People from Eagan, Minnesota
Democratic Party members of the Minnesota House of Representatives
Minnesota lawyers
Loras College alumni
University of Iowa College of Law alumni
21st-century American politicians
Candidates in the 2012 United States elections
Candidates in the 2014 United States elections
People from St. Croix County, Wisconsin